Radu Troi, (12 June 1949 in Dragomireşti Vale, Ilfov), is a former Romanian professional football player.

He won 15 caps for Romania and scored 3 goals. He also has one cap for Romania's Olympic team.

Honours
Steaua București
Liga I: 1975–76, 1977–78
Cupa României: 1975–76, 1978–79

References

External links

1949 births
Association football forwards
People from Giurgiu
Romania international footballers
Romanian footballers
Liga I players
Liga II players
FC Steaua București players
Faur București players
FC Dinamo București players
FC Argeș Pitești players
FC Steaua București assistant managers
Living people